Czerniewo may refer to the following places in Poland:

 Czerniewo, Masovian Voivodeship
 Czerniewo, Pomeranian Voivodeship